The 2017 Men's Oceania Handball Challenge Trophy was held at the Bluesky Sports Arena, Rarotonga, Cook Islands in between 31 July and  6 August 2017.

The competition participants were defending champions Tahiti, Australia, host Cook Islands, New Zealand, New Caledonia and Papua New Guinea.

Defending Champions Tahiti won over New Caledonia. Australia took the bronze, next was New Zealand. Papua New Guinea were fifth with tournament hosts Cook Islands sixth. Voted best player was Teva’i Hanere from Tahiti. Tahiti qualify for the 2017 IHF Inter-Continental Trophy in Gothenburg, Sweden.

Results

Rankings

References

 Cook Islands thumped in handball opener. Cook Island News. 1 August, 2017
 Tahiti ready for the Cooks. Cook Island News. 2 August, 2017
 les Calédoniens battent l'Australie! Les Nouvelles Caledoniennes (french). 3 August. 2017
 New Caledonia and Tahiti start IHF Trophy strong. International Handball Federation webpage. 4 August, 2017
 La Calédonie perd de 15 buts contre Tahiti. Les Nouvelles Caledoniennes (french). 5 August. 2017
 Australian Jewish News. 24 August 2017
 2017 French Pacific Junior Men's Handball Cup
 Official results - IHF

Oceania Handball Challenge Trophy
Oceania Handball Challenge Trophy